Renfrew North was an electoral riding in Ontario, Canada. It was created in 1867 at the time of confederation and was abolished in 1996 before the 1999 election.

Members of Provincial Parliament

References

Former provincial electoral districts of Ontario